Albanian Broadband Communication (ABCom) is an Albanian telecommunications, television and internet provider. It was established in April 1998, and is one of the ISP operating in the country.

History
ABCOM was created in April 1998 in Albania. ABCOM is the first service provider in Albania. It is based in Tirana. ABCom was functional in 6 cities before it was purchased. When the merge process was completed in 2020 Vodafone Albania announced that it will invest 100 million euros to improve the fixed line services, internet speeds and capacities.

References

Telecommunications companies of Albania
Telecommunications in Albania